Burdiehouse is an area in the south east of Edinburgh, Scotland, near Gilmerton and Southhouse. Its name is often said to be a corruption of Bordeaux, as a result of settlement in the area by French immigrants associated with Mary, Queen of Scots (cf Little France nearby), but this is by no means certain.

Today, Burdiehouse is an area with a high level of residents living in poverty.

The Burdiehouse Burn (known elsewhere as the Lothian Burn, Niddrie Burn and Brunstane Burn) flows through the area.

External links
Burdiehouse at Gazetteer for Scotland

Areas of Edinburgh
Housing estates in Edinburgh